The 1991 Paris–Tours was the 85th edition of the Paris–Tours cycle race and was held on 13 October 1991. The race started in Issy-les-Moulineaux and finished in Tours. The race was won by Johan Capiot of the TVM team.

General classification

References

1991 in French sport
1991
1991 UCI Road World Cup
1991 in road cycling
October 1991 sports events in Europe